The Bombay Times is a free supplement of The Times of India, in the Mumbai (formerly Bombay) region.

It covers celebrity news, news features, international and national music news, international and national fashion news, lifestyle and feature articles pegged on news events both national and international that have local interest value. The main paper covers national news. Over ten years of presence, it has become a benchmark for the Page 3 social scene.

The Times of India - and thereby the Bombay Times - are market leaders in terms of circulation.

The name of this supplement contains the word Bombay, which is the older Portuguese name of the city. It is not retained in the new supplement Mumbai Mirror that comes with Times of India.

External links
 Bombay Times - Official Website
 Bombay Times - Online supplement

The Times of India
Publications of The Times Group
Mass media in Mumbai
Publications with year of establishment missing